The Chief Justice of Pakistan (initials as CJP) is head of the court system of Pakistan (the judicature branch of government) and the chief judge of the Supreme Court of Pakistan. The officeholder is the senior most of 17 senior justices of the Supreme Court of Pakistan. 

The Federal Court of Pakistan was established by Governor-General Jinnah's Order in February 1948. Until 1956, the chief justice and senior justices were known by the title of 'Federal Judge', and the Federal Court of Pakistan operated out of a wing of the Lahore High Court, despite the federal capital's location in Karachi. The enactment of Pakistan's first constitution in March 1956 redesigned it as the 'Supreme Court of Pakistan.' 

The chief justice is the chief administrative officer of the country's court system and the highest judicial officer, ranking immediately above the chief justice of the Federal Shariat Court, and is responsible for supervising federal judicial policies, and conducting judicial business in the Supreme Court.

Nomination for the appointment of the chief justice is made by the prime minister of Pakistan, and final appointments are confirmed by the president of Pakistan. Presiding over the oral arguments before the court, the chief justice has significant agenda-setting power over meetings of the Supreme Court. In modern tradition, the chief justice has the ceremonial duty of administering the oath of office of the president of Pakistan.

The first chief justice was Sir Abdul Rashid. The current chief justice is Umar Ata Bandial; incumbent since 2 February 2022.

List of chief justices 
Pakistan's longest-serving chief justice was Mohammad Haleem for total of 3,205 days. The shortest-serving chief justice was Muhammad Shahabuddin, who died in office 9 days after taking oath. Iftikhar Muhammad Chaudhry is the only justice to have served non-consecutive terms, for a total of three terms with total of 2,480 days.

 A Acting
 ± Recess appointment, later rejected by the Supreme Judicial Council. All decisions voided due to illegality of appointment.
 † Died in office

Timeline

See also
 Supreme Court of Pakistan
 Pakistan Bar Council
 Punjab Bar Council
 Supreme Court Bar Association of Pakistan

References

External links
Supreme Court of Pakistan

 
Judiciary of Pakistan
List of Chief Justices of Supreme Court of Pakistan